The Lagos East Senatorial District in Lagos State, Nigeria covers the local government areas of Epe, Ibeju-Lekki, Ikorodu, Kosofe, and Somolu. The senator currently representing the district is Tokunbo Abiru of the All Progressives Congress who was elected with 87.2% of the vote in 2020.

List of Senators

References 

Politics of Lagos State
Senatorial districts in Nigeria
Members of the Senate (Nigeria)